Matthew Sanderson, better known by the stage name Detox Icunt or simply Detox, is an American drag performer and recording artist. Detox was a fixture of the Southern California drag scene before coming to international attention on the fifth season of RuPaul's Drag Race.

Career
Detox has appeared in music videos with Ke$ha and Rihanna and is a member of Chad Michaels' Dreamgirls Revue, the longest-running female-impersonation show in California. She is also a member of the band Tranzkuntinental. The band was started by Charlie Paulson and Xander Smith and features drag queens Kelly Mantle, Rhea Litré, Vicky Vox, and Willam Belli.

Detox modeled as part of the Tranimal Master Class Workshop at the Machine Project. The event was photographed by Austin Young.

In 2011, Detox acted in Showgirls in Drag, a live adaptation of Showgirls. The production was directed by Stephen Guarino and played at the Dragonfly nightclub in Hollywood.

In March 2012, Willam Belli released "Chow Down," a parody of "Hold On" by Wilson Phillips. The song featured Detox and Vicky Vox, who co-wrote the parody's lyrics. The three began performing under the name DWV, a dual reference that takes note of their first initials (Detox, Willam and Vicky) while also parodying the group SWV. Together they released several other singles: "Boy is a Bottom," a parody of "Girl on Fire" by Alicia Keys which debuted at number six on Billboards Comedy Digital Songs, selling 3,000 downloads in its first week.; "Silicone", a parody of "Dancing on My Own" by Robyn; and "Blurred Bynes", a parody of "Blurred Lines" by Robin Thicke.

In November 2012, Logo announced that Detox was among 14 drag queens who would be competing on the fifth season of RuPaul's Drag Race. Detox won the children's TV show-themed main challenge in the episode "Draggle Rock." As part of the show, Detox sang on the "We Are the World"-inspired song "Can I Get an Amen?", with the song's proceeds benefiting the Los Angeles Gay and Lesbian Center. Detox placed fourth in the competition, becoming the last queen eliminated before the finale episode.

In June 2016, Detox was announced as one of the cast members on the second season of RuPaul's All Stars Drag Race. She ultimately finished as a runner up in the competition alongside Katya.

In 2017, Detox appeared in the film Cherry Pop, directed by Assaad Yacoub, alongside fellow Drag Race alumni Tempest DuJour, Mayhem Miller and Bob the Drag Queen.

In April 2019, Lizzo released a second music video for her song "Juice", in which Detox makes an appearance. In June 2019, a panel of judges from New York magazine placed her 14th on their list of "the most powerful drag queens in America", a ranking of 100 former Drag Race contestants. She was one of 37 queens to appear on the cover.

Discography

Singles

Other appearances

Filmography

Television

Web series

Film

Music video appearances

References

External links
 
 
 
 

Living people
American drag queens
American gay actors
American gay musicians
LGBT people from Florida
American LGBT singers
RuPaul's Drag Race contestants
Year of birth missing (living people)
Detox Icunt
20th-century American LGBT people
21st-century LGBT people
Place of birth missing (living people)